Mário Sérgio Aumarante Santana (born 30 January 1977 in Adustina, Brazil), known as just Mário Sérgio, Brazilian footballer who plays as a midfielder, his last known club was Simurq of the Azerbaijan Premier League.

Career
Mário Sérgio joined Khazar Lankaran on 10 January 2008 from Brazilian side Portuguesa, and was the club's top goal scorer during the 2009–10 season with 13 in 28 games.

Career statistics

Honours
 Coritiba
 Campeonato Paranaense (1) - 2003
 Khazar Lankaran
 Azerbaijan Cup (1) - 2007–08

References

External links

1977 births
Living people
Brazilian footballers
Association football midfielders
FC Lokomotiv 1929 Sofia players
Coritiba Foot Ball Club players
Ulsan Hyundai FC players
Adap Galo Maringá Football Club players
Dubai CSC players
Associação Portuguesa de Desportos players
Khazar Lankaran FK players
Shamakhi FK players
Simurq PIK players
K League 1 players
Azerbaijan Premier League players
Expatriate footballers in South Korea
Expatriate footballers in the United Arab Emirates
Expatriate footballers in Azerbaijan
UAE Pro League players